(1) Use Endospermum as a food plant.(2) Use Omphalea as a food plant   and adults are diurnal. Urapterita is not included for lack of data.

The Uraniinae or uraniine moths are a subfamily of moths in the family Uraniidae. It contains seven genera that occur in the tropics of the world.

Three of its genera (Alcides, Chrysiridia, and Urania) are essentially diurnal, although some crepuscular activity has been recorded. They are blackish with markings in iridescent green or light blue;  some species have orange, gold or pink highlights. They are as brightly marked as the most colorful butterflies; indeed, they bear an uncanny resemblance in shape and coloration to some papilionid butterflies (swallowtails and relatives). They are also usually toxic, hence the bright warning colors. Cases are known where harmless butterflies mimic these toxic moths, e.g. Papilio laglaizei and Alcides agathyrsus.

The remaining genera in the subfamily are far less colorful, overall gray-brown with a light band on each wing (Lyssa) or white with brownish markings (Cyphura, Urapteritra, and Urapteroides), and mainly nocturnal or crepuscular. No other species in the subfamily has a wingspan that exceeds .

Species 
This list of species is adapted mostly with some rearrangements from The Global Lepidoptera Names Index; it is likely to be fairly complete (as of January 2006) as including valid species for most of which distributional information is here given.

 Alcides Hübner, [1822]
 Alcides agathyrsus Kirsch, 1877 (New Guinea)
 Alcides argyrios Gmelin, 1788
 Alcides arnus Felder & Rogenhofer, 1874
 Alcides aruus Felder, 1874 (Aru I.)
 Alcides aurora Salvin & Godman, 1877 (New Britain, New Ireland)
 Alcides boops Westwood, 1879
 Alcides cydnus Felder, 1859 (Maluku)
 Alcides latona Druce, 1886 (Solomons)
 Alcides liris Felder, 1860 (New Guinea)
 Alcides metaurus (Hopffer, 1856) (Australia)
 Alcides orontes (Linnaeus, 1763) (Moluccas, Ambon Island)
 Alcides ribbei Pagenstecher, 1912
 Alcides sordidior Rothschild, 1916
 Alcides zodiaca (Butler, 1869) (Australia)

 Chrysiridia Hübner, [1823]
 Chrysiridia croesus (Gerstaecker, 1871) – African sunset moth (Tanzania)
 Chrysiridia rhipheus (Drury, 1773) – Madagascan sunset moth (Madagascar)

 Cyphura Warren, 1902
 Cyphura albisecta Warren
 Cyphura approximans Swinhoe, 1916
 Cyphura atramentaria Warren
 Cyphura bifasciata Butler, 1879
 Cyphura catenulata Warren, 1902
 Cyphura caudiferaria Boisduval
 Cyphura clarissima Butler
 Cyphura costalis Butler
 Cyphura dealbata Warren
 Cyphura destrigata Kirsch
 Cyphura extensa Rothschild
 Cyphura falka Swinhoe
 Cyphura geminia (Cramer, 1777) (Ambon Island)
 Cyphura gutturalis Swinhoe, 1916
 Cyphura latimarginata Swinhoe, 1902
 Cyphura maxima Strand
 Cyphura multistrigaria Warren
 Cyphura mundaria Walker
 Cyphura pannata Felder
 Cyphura pardata Warren
 Cyphura phantasma Felder
 Cyphura pieridaria Warren, 1902
 Cyphura reducta Joicey & Talbot
 Cyphura semialba Warren
 Cyphura semiobsoleta Warren
 Cyphura subsimilis Warren, 1902
 Cyphura swinhoei Joicey, 1917
 Cyphura urapteroides Joicey

 Lyssa Hübner, 1823
 Lyssa achillaria Hübner, 1816
 Lyssa curvata Skinner, 1903 (Vanuatu)
 Lyssa fletcheri Regteren Altena, 1953
 Lyssa macleayi (Montrouzier, 1857) (Australia)
 Lyssa menoetius (Hopffer, 1856) (Borneo, Philippines, Sangir, Sulawesi)
 Lyssa menoetius adspersus (Regteren Altena, 1953) (Kalimantan)
 Lyssa menoetius celebensis (Regteren Altena, 1953) (Sulawesi)
 Lyssa mutata Butler, 1887 (Solomons)
 Lyssa patroclus (Linnaeus, 1758) (Moluccas)
 Lyssa patroclaria Hübner, 1816
 Lyssa toxopeusi Regteren Altena, 1953
 Lyssa velutinus Röber, 1927
 Lyssa zampa (Butler, 1869) (Himalaya to southern China, Thailand, Andamans, Philippines, Sulawesi)
 Lyssa zampa docile (Butler, 1877) (Andaman Islands)
 Lyssa zampa dilutus (Röber, 1927) (Sulawesi)

 Urania Fabricius, 1807
 Urania leilus (Linnaeus, 1758) (Central and Amazonian South America)
 Urania brasiliensis Swainson, 1833 (Atlantic forest, Brazil)
 Urania fulgens (Walker, 1854) (Veracruz, Mexico, throughout Central America to northern Ecuador west of the Andes)
 Urania poeyi Herrich-Schäffer, 1866 (E. Cuba)
 Urania boisduvalii Guérin-Meneville, 1829 (W. Cuba)
 Urania amphiclus Guenée, 1857]
 Urania elegans Niepelt, 1930
 Urania fernandinae MacLeay, 1834
 Urania surinamensis Swainson]
 Urania occidentalis Swainson, 1833
 Urania sloanus Cramer, 1779 (Jamaica, extinct circa 1894)
 Urania sloanaria Hübner, 1816

 Urapteritra Viette, 1972
 Urapteritra antsianakariae Oberthür, 1923 (Madagascar)
 Urapteritra falcifera (Weymer, 1892) (East Africa)
 Urapteritra mabillei Viette, 1972 (Madagascar)
 Urapteritra montana Viette, 1972 (Madagascar)
 Urapteritra piperita Oberthür, 1923 (Madagascar)
 Urapteritra recurvata Warren (Madagascar)
 Urapteritra suavis Oberthür, 1923 (Madagascar)
 Urapteritra fasciata (Mabille, 1878)(Madagascar)

 Urapteroides Moore, 1888
 Urapteroides anerces Meyrick, 1886 (Fiji)
 Urapteroides astheniata (Guenée, 1857) (Himalaya to New Guinea, Queensland)
 Urapteroides diana Swinhoe (Peninsular Malaysia) (possibly a form of U. astheniata)
 Urapteroides equestraria Boisduval
 Urapteroides hermaea Druce, 1888
 Urapteroides hyemalis Butler, 1887 (Solomons, Vanuatu)
 Urapteroides malgassaria Mabille, 1878
 Urapteroides swinhoei Rothschild
 Urapteroides urapterina Butler, 1877

References

External links 
 Moths of Borneo: Subfamily Uraniinae (with pictures and description of species: Lyssa zampa, L. menoetius, Urapteroides astheniata)

Further reading 
 van Regteren Altena, C. O. (1953) A revision of the genus Nyctalemon Dalman (Lepidoptera, Uraniidae) with notes on the biology, distribution, and evolution of its species. Zoologische Verhandelingen 19(1): 1-58. Note: Nyctalemon is a junior synonym of Lyssa.

Uraniidae